Amphichaeta is a genus of annelids belonging to the family Naididae.

The genus was first described by P. Tauber in 1879.

Species
Amphichaeta leydigi
Amphichaeta sannio Kallstenius, 1892

References

Tubificina